Chairmen of the State Assembly of Bashkortostan

Chairmen of the Supreme Council

Chairmen of the State Assembly of Bashkortostan

See also
List of Chairmen of the Chamber of Representatives of the State Assembly of Bashkortostan
List of Chairmen of the Legislative Chamber of the State Assembly of Bashkortostan

Sources

Lists of legislative speakers in Russia
Chairmen